Kathryn Mann is a mathematician who has won the Rudin Award, Birman Prize, Duszenko Award, and Sloan Fellowship for her research in geometric topology and geometric group theory. She is an assistant professor of mathematics at Cornell University.

Education and career
Mann graduated from the University of Toronto in 2008,  with a bachelor's degree in mathematics and philosophy. She completed her Ph.D. in mathematics at the University of Chicago in 2014. Her dissertation, Components of Representation Spaces, was supervised by Benson Farb.

Mann was a Morrey Visiting Assistant Professor and National Science Foundation funded postdoctoral researcher at the University of California, Berkeley from 2014 to 2016, postdoctoral researcher at the Mathematical Sciences Research Institute in 2015, a visiting professor at Pierre and Marie Curie University in 2016, and Manning Assistant Professor of Mathematics at Brown University from 2017 to 2019. She moved to Cornell University as an assistant professor in 2019.

Research
Mann's research involves the symmetries of manifolds.

She has made significant progress on a problem posed by Étienne Ghys: when the symmetries of one manifold act nontrivially on a second manifold, must the first manifold have smaller or equal dimension to the second one?

She has also studied the rigidity of groups of symmetries of surfaces.

Recognition
In 2016, Mann won the Mary Ellen Rudin Award for "her deep and extensive work on homeomorphism groups of manifolds". The Association for Women in Mathematics gave Mann their 2019 Joan & Joseph Birman Research Prize in Topology and Geometry, for "major breakthroughs in the theory of dynamics of group actions on manifolds". Also in 2019, the Wrocław Mathematicians Foundation gave Mann the Kamil Duszenko Award.

Mann has also been funded by a National Science Foundation CAREER Award and by a Sloan Research Fellowship.

Selected publications

References

External links
Home page

Year of birth missing (living people)
Living people
Women mathematicians
Topologists
University of Toronto alumni
University of Chicago alumni
University of California, Berkeley faculty
Brown University faculty
Cornell University faculty
Sloan Research Fellows